The Dark Corner is a 1946 American crime film noir directed by Henry Hathaway and starring Lucille Ball, Clifton Webb, William Bendix and Mark Stevens. The film was not a commercial success but has since been described as a "Grade A example of film noir."

Plot
Private investigator Bradford Galt has moved from San Francisco to New York to escape a troubled past. He blames his former partner Tony Jardine for his problems. Complicating matters, he is being hounded by New York Police Lieutenant Frank Reeves and finds that he is being followed by a thug in a white suit. After a little rough "persuasion", the thug admits he has been hired by Jardine. Or was he?

Galt suspects Jardine is trying to frame him for a murder. But it turns out that Jardine is just part of a wider-ranging conspiracy involving a wealthy art gallery owner, Hardy Cathcart. With the help of his sharp-witted secretary Kathleen (Lucille Ball), Galt is able to overcome all these obstacles and clear himself.

Cast
 Lucille Ball as Kathleen Stewart
 Clifton Webb as Hardy Cathcart
 William Bendix as Stauffer aka Fred Foss
 Mark Stevens as Bradford Galt
 Kurt Kreuger as Tony Jardine
 Cathy Downs as Mari Cathcart
 Reed Hadley as Police Lt Frank Reeves
 Constance Collier as Mrs. Kingsley
 Eddie Heywood and His Orchestra

Production 
Fox paid $40,000 for the rights to Leo Rosten's story prior to its publication in Good Housekeeping. Rosten published the story under the pen name Leonard Q. Ross.

The film's locations and settings including office buildings in Manhattan, the Bowery and the Third Avenue El. "The El is a presence throughout the movie, its cross ties, stanchions and stairways acting as a shadowy geometric spider web, and its perpetual racket contributing to the paranoia of Stevens's private detective, whose office window is feet from the tracks." The arcade sequence was filmed in Santa Monica, California.

Ida Lupino was initially cast as Kathleen, but had to withdraw because of scheduling conflicts, and Fred MacMurray was originally slated for the role of Galt.

Studio production head Darryl F. Zanuck borrowed Lucille Ball from MGM to play Kathleen. At the time, Ball was trying to break from MGM and had an "unsettled" personal life. A Henry Hathaway biographer observes: "Early into the shoot, it was obvious to Hathaway that Ball was not concentrating on her job. After she flubbed her lines one time too many, Hathaway embarrassed her before her peers by ordering her to leave the set and actually read the script." It turned out to be one of her best dramatic performances. According to Hathaway, Ball subsequently apologized for her behavior.

Hathaway described Webb as an "angel, but he never really was a good actor. He was a character. He was marvelous because he was so elegant." Hathaway said that The Dark Corner was "not a successful film. It was dead. Mark Stevens never quite cut it. Too arrogant, cocksure."

Critical response 
The Dark Corner has a score of 100% at Rotten Tomatoes, indicating overall critical praise of the movie. AllMovie rates it three out of five stars, and calls it "a grade-A example of 'film noir.'"

At the time of its release in March 1946, New York Times critic Bosley Crowther called The Dark Corner "a tough-fibered, exciting entertainment" and praised Hathaway's direction.  He said that Stevens was   "convincingly hard-boiled as the baffled gumshoe"  and said that "he has a rare combination of talent and personality which, if properly developed, will place him in the forefront of leading men in short order." He also praised the performances of Webb, Bendix and Ball, but said that if Webb "doesn't change his style soon, his admirers are likely to grow impatient."

Also in 1946, Baltimore Sun critic Donald Kirkley said the film "is very good indeed for this sort of uninhibited whodunit." He said that the film was "sparked by a most engaging performance by Lucille Ball" and "a very fine, hard-boiled portrayal of a tough guy by William Bendix." Stevens only "gets by" in the film, Kirkley said, and called him "a road edition of Dick Powell." He criticized the script, saying that the Webb character's motivation is unclear, and that overall it often "speeds into high gear, but just as often relaxes into spells of relative inertness and tedium."

Box office 
The film took in $1 million at the box office, less than the $1.2 million cost of production.

Legacy 
The Dark Corner was overshadowed by Hathaway's other semidocumentary and noir films, such as Kiss of Death and The House on 92nd Street, but has gained a reputation as a "sleeper" and "unsung classic" of the film noir genre. The film is "rich in bottomless shadowplay, a persuasive feathering of second unit New York location work and sound stage mock-ups with the odd Los Angeles location doubling for Manhattan and a screenplay rife with pulpy zingers."

Bradford Galt's comment "There goes my last lead. I'm all dead inside. I'm backed up in a dark corner, and I don't know who's hitting me" has been described as a "prime example of existential anguish" that typifies film noir.

References

External links

 
 
 
 
 
 

1946 films
1940s crime thriller films
American crime thriller films
American black-and-white films
1940s English-language films
American detective films
Film noir
Films based on short fiction
Films scored by Cyril J. Mockridge
Films set in New York City
20th Century Fox films
Films directed by Henry Hathaway
1940s American films
English-language thriller films